USS Ozaukee (ID-3439) was a United States Navy cargo ship in commission from 1918 to 1919.

Construction, acquisition, and commissioning 
SS Ozaukee was built in 1918 as a commercial cargo ship by the Long Beach Shipbuilding Company at Long Beach, California, for the United States Shipping Board. Upon her completion in September 1918, the U.S. Navy acquired her from the Shipping Board on a bareboat charter basis. Assigned the naval registry identification number 3439, she was commissioned on 30 September 1918 as USS Ozaukee (ID-3439) at San Pedro, California.

Operational history 
Fitted out for service with the Naval Overseas Transportation Service, Ozaukee departed the United States West Coast on 9 October 1918 bound for Chile. At Arica, Chile, she took on nitrates and steamed via the Panama Canal to Jacksonville, Florida, where she arrived on 7 December 1918. Ozaukee then carried a U.S. Shipping Board cargo from Charleston, South Carolina, to Philadelphia, Pennsylvania.

At the end of January 1919, Ozaukee departed Philadelphia to cross the Atlantic Ocean to deliver oil and tobacco to London in the United Kingdom. When she was about 700 nautical miles (1,296 kilometers) east of Philadelphia her steering gear carried away in heavy weather. Her crew rigged temporary steering gear and she completed the trip, arriving at London in mid-February 1919. In March 1919 she made the return voyage from London, arriving at Philadelphia on 15 March 1919.

Decommissioning and disposal 
Ozaukee was decommissioned at Philadelphia on 3 April 1919. The Navy returned her to the U.S. Shipping Board the same day. Once again SS Ozaukee, she remained in the custody of the Shipping Board until she was scrapped in 1929.

References 

Department of the Navy: Naval Historical Center Online Library of Selected Images: U.S. Navy Ships: USS Ozaukee (ID # 3439), 1918–1919. Originally, and later, Ozaukee (American Freighter, 1918).
NavSource Online: Section Patrol Craft Photo Archive: Ozaukee (ID 3439)

 

Auxiliary ships of the United States Navy
World War I cargo ships of the United States
Ships built in Los Angeles
1918 ships